Katja Steen Salskov-Iversen (born 19 August 1994) is a Danish sailor in the 49er FX class. Together with Jena Hansen she won a bronze medal at the 2016 Olympics.

References

1994 births
Living people
Danish female sailors (sport)
Olympic bronze medalists for Denmark
Sailors at the 2016 Summer Olympics – 49er FX
Olympic sailors of Denmark
Olympic medalists in sailing
Medalists at the 2016 Summer Olympics